Johnny Naipaul (28 December 1927 – 5 February 1983) was a Guyanese cricketer. He played in one first-class match for British Guiana in 1944/45.

See also
 List of Guyanese representative cricketers

References

External links
 

1927 births
1983 deaths
Guyanese cricketers
Guyana cricketers